Robert McBride (born 6 July 1963) is the former chief of the metropolitan police for Ekurhuleni Metropolitan Municipality. During the apartheid era he was a member of Umkhonto we Sizwe, the armed wing of the African National Congress, and was convicted of terrorism after he bombed Magoos Bar, a busy night club, in an attack that killed three people. However, this conviction was "for all purposes...deemed not to have taken place" under the Promotion of National Unity and Reconciliation Act.

In February 2014 McBride was appointed as executive director of the Independent Police Investigative Directorate. In March 2015 he was suspended from this position by the Minister of Police. The decision was set aside by the Constitutional Court of South Africa in September 2016. He has been appointed as head of the Foreign Branch of the State Security Agency from 1 July 2020.

Biography

During apartheid

McBride was born in Addington Hospital to Derrick McBride and grew up in Wentworth, a racially segregated suburb about 11 km from Durban, where his parents were schoolteachers. He attended Fairvale High School in Wentworth and participated in extramural activities like rugby, karate, boxing, chess, hockey and soccer. After he was beaten by an older boy in the neighbourhood, his father taught him martial arts.

He developed political views at an early age due to influence of his father. He was particularly influenced by two books: A.J. Venter's Coloured: A Profile of 2 Million South Africans, which describes the efforts of coloured political activists such as James April, Don Mattera, Jakes Gerwel, Basil February, and his uncle, Rev. Clive McBride; and Soledad Brothers: The Prison Letters of George Jackson, written by a founding member of the American Black Guerrilla Family.

McBride was best known for his leadership of the cell that bombed the "Why Not" Restaurant and Magoo's Bar in Durban on 14 June 1986, an attack in which three white women were killed and 69 people injured. He was captured and convicted for the Durban bombing, and sentenced to death, but later reprieved while on death row. In 1992, he was released after his actions were classified as politically motivated. He was later granted amnesty at the Truth and Reconciliation Commission (TRC), which provided for amnesty in return for complete disclosure of acts of politically motivated violence after the ANC changed its early denials of involvement to a claim that they ordered the bombing. The South African government, at the time, had portrayed the attack as being targeted at innocent civilians.

The Truth and Reconciliation Commission (South Africa) report stated, "It seems that not many, if any, of the victims in this incident were members of the South African Police. Furthermore, the criticisms directed at the quality of reconnaissance of the "Why Not Bar" might very well be valid. It may be, as was argued, that he ought to have ensured at the relevant time that the primary targets of the attack were present and therefore the concept of the proportionality of the attack and its results must be considered." McBride and others were granted amnesty for the attack, although the commission did find the bombing to be a "gross violation of human rights", as well for other offences including those arising from the escape of Gordon Webster. In 2006, McBride received the Merit Medal in Silver and the Conspicuous Leadership Star from the South African National Defence Force for his service and combat leadership in Umkhonto We Sizwe.

After apartheid
On 9 March 1998, McBride, then a high-ranking official in the Department of Foreign Affairs, was arrested by the Mozambican police in Ressano Garcia on charges of gun running from Mozambique to South Africa, despite an attempt to run for the border. He was about to receive 50 AK-47 rifles and 100 Makarov pistols. He maintained he was investigating the arms smuggling trade while working with the South African National Intelligence Agency (NIA). After a period in detention, all charges were dropped. Inkatha Freedom Party (IFP) head Mangosuthu Buthelezi suggested the weapons had been meant for assassins to target IFP leaders.

In 1999, McBride faced an assault charge after he, underworld figure Cyril Beeka, and another man with whom they were visiting an escort agency, allegedly assaulted an employee.

McBride was held up by IRA/Sinn Féin leader Martin McGuinness as an example of a former combatant who moved up into a leadership role following the political changes in South Africa.

In 2003, McBride was appointed Chief of the Metropolitan Police of Ekurhuleni Municipality (formerly East Rand).

On 21 December 2006, after a Christmas party McBride was involved in a single car collision near Centurion. According to witnesses, McBride was under the influence of alcohol. Ekurhuleni metro police quickly arrived even though the scene was more than 40 km out of their jurisdiction. According to witnesses the Ekurhuleni metro police assaulted witnesses and threatened to shoot them if they phoned the South African Police Service (SAPS). McBride was quickly removed from the scene by the Ekurhuleni metro police. It was unclear whether in accordance with standard police procedure blood samples were taken by the Ekurhuleni metro police, or by a medical facility, to determine his blood-alcohol level.

Three of the Ekurhuleni metro police involved in removing McBride from the accident scene, Patrick Johnston, Stanley Segathevan and Ithumeleng Koko initially supported McBride but subsequently gave "damning statements" to the South African Police. Thereafter, it was reported that on 4 July 2007 McBride and a number of cars of Ekurhuleni metro police detained and intimidated Patrick Johnston at a petrol station, on the pretext that he was driving a car with tinted windows which is against South African traffic law. Segathevan joined Johnston, and members of the Boksburg SAPS Task Force arrived at the scene. McBride is alleged to have abused the SAPS members.

Johnston and Segathevan were arrested by the Ekurhuleni metro police, but Henk Strydom, Boksburg's senior public prosecutor, declined to prosecute due to "insufficient evidence and a case totally without merit", and Johnston and Segathevan obtained a court interdict to protect them from McBride and the Ekurhuleni Metro Police Department, as they claimed McBride had made death threats against them, which McBride denied. McBride was charged with drunken driving, fraud and defeating the ends of justice following the car accident. In his defence he produced a medical certificate stating that he was suffering from hypoglycaemia (low blood sugar). The doctor who gave him the certificate is facing charges of fraud and defeating the ends of justice with regard to the certificate.

In 2011 the Constitutional Court found in The Citizen 1978 Pty (Ltd) and others v Mcbride 2011 (4) SA 191 (CC) that Mcbride may be called a murderer.

In July 2021, McBride was suspended from his position as head of the foreign branch of the State Security Agency. The SAA would not reveal if his dismissal was related to a failed SSA operation earlier in 2021, where four South African spies were caught and left stranded in Maputo, Mozambique. The spies were returned to South Africa after the intervention of state security minister Ayanda Dlodlo.

Biographies
Two authors have written biographies on the life of Robert McBride:

References

1963 births
Living people
Coloured South African people
South African activists
People convicted on terrorism charges
South African people of Irish descent
South African police officers convicted of crimes
Police officers convicted of murder
Prisoners sentenced to death by South Africa
South African prisoners sentenced to death
People from Durban
UMkhonto we Sizwe personnel
People who testified at the Truth and Reconciliation Commission (South Africa)
Bombers (people)